Douglas High School is a public high school in Douglas, Massachusetts, United States serving 382 students in grades 9-12 in the Douglas School District.

Demographics 
Douglas High School is home to 336 students, of which 175 are male and 161 are female.  There is roughly equal representation dispersed among the grade levels, with 72 freshmen, 90 sophomores, 80 juniors, and 92 seniors.

Douglas High School has a total of 35 teachers and a student-faculty ratio of 11.1 to 1.

Racially, Douglas High School is fairly homogeneous.  The majority of students identify as White (90.5%).  5.4% are Hispanic, 1.5% are Asian, 1.8 Multi-Race, Non-Hispanic, 0.6% African American, and 0.3% Native Hawaiian/Pacific Islander.

Advanced placement testing 
Douglas High School offers Advanced Placement (AP) courses to its students.  According to data from U.S. News & World Report for the 2021-2022 school year, 49% of Douglas High School students participated in at least one AP exam during that year.  Of those students, 44% passed at least one AP test.

Athletics 
Douglas High School is part of the Dual Valley Conference which also includes Blackstone-Millville Regional High School, Hopedale Junior Senior High School, Nipmuc Regional High School, Sutton High School, and Whitinsville Christian High School.

Students at Douglas High School compete in a variety of athletics, including golf, soccer, volleyball, cross country, cheerleading, indoor track and field, basketball, softball, baseball, and outdoor track and field. Douglas also participates in a football co-op with Sutton, a boys' hockey with Hopedale, a girls' hockey co-op with Auburn, and a field hockey co-op with Blackstone Millville.

See also 

 List of high schools in Massachusetts

References

External links
School website

Public high schools in Massachusetts
Schools in Worcester County, Massachusetts
Buildings and structures in Douglas, Massachusetts